Aliabad-e Vali Shahanvazi (also Romanized as ‘Alīābād-e Valī Shahanvāzī) is a village in Chahdegal Rural District, Negin Kavir District, Fahraj County, Kerman Province, Iran. At the 2006 census, the village's population was 536 and 118 families.

References 

Populated places in Fahraj County